Washington School District was a school district in Hempstead County, Arkansas, headquartered in Washington.

It was dissolved on July 1, 1990. Its territory was given to Blevins, Hope, and Saratoga school districts.

Further reading
  (Download)

References

1990 disestablishments in Arkansas
School districts disestablished in 1990
Defunct school districts in Arkansas
Education in Hempstead County, Arkansas